Allium nigrum, common name black garlic, broad-leaved leek, or broadleaf garlic, is a Middle Eastern species of wild onion. It lacks the onion or garlic scent shared by most of the other species in the group. The species is native to Turkey, Cyprus, Syria, Lebanon, and Israel but cultivated as an ornamental in many other places. It has become naturalized in some regions, including parts of the United States (especially Washington and Oregon).

Description 

Allium nigrum produces asymmetric bulbs up to 5 cm across. Each plant has 3-6 leaves, lanceolate in shape, flat and bent to the side, up to 60 cm long and 2.5 cm across. Later the leaves become reflexed. Scapes are smooth and round in cross-section, 80–100 cm tall. The scape carries a dense umbellate inflorescence with star-like flowers up to 9 mm across; tepals white with a green midvein; anthers purple or yellow. The ovaries are black-green (but flushed with red in the Levant) in anthesis, but green when younger or following anthesis.

Taxonomy 
Type species of Subgenus (Section) Melanocrommyum. Molecular evidence suggests that A. nigrum is a polymorphous species consisting of several infraspecific groups.

Subdivision 
Alliances:
 Allium nigrum
 Allium asclepiadeum
 Allium orientale

Allium nigrum alliance:
Allium nigrum L. and A. multibulbosum Jacq. have often been treated as variants within a variable A. nigrum sensu lato. The type variant, A. nigrum sensu stricto is characterised by rose oblong tepals, rose filaments, and distinctly tri-sulcate, strongly coarse, dull, permanently green ovaries, while A. multibulbosum have white to pinkish-carmine, oblong tepals, filaments of the same color as tepals, but rounded, narrowly hexasulcate, smooth and commonly glossy ovaries. The latter commonly turn green from black, but some are permanently green. These variants are in a sister group relationship. The World Checklist of Selected Plant Families (WCLSPF) treat these as separate species.

However, Allium basalticum has been considered sufficiently distinct on molecular grounds, to be recognised as a new separate species. Another distinct species is Allium dumetorum.

Allium asclepiadeum alliance:
Allium asclepiadeum Bornm. was initially considered a separate species, but then submerged in A. nigrum. It has again been treated as a separate species based on molecular data, but under the new name of Allium meronense Fragman & R.M. Fritsch. WCLSPF, while accepting this new species, have retained A. asclepiadeum as a separate species.

Allium orientale alliance: descriptions of Allium orientale Boiss. have varied, resulting in the name being applied to a variety of different plants, a concept not supported by molecular data which indicate Allium israeliticum Fragman & R.M. Fritsch, as a distinct new species. WCLSPF recognises both as distinct species.

Etymology 
The name nigrum (Latin: black) is derived from the colour of the ovaries.

Uses
The plant is a frequent ornamental in European and North American gardens, having been introduced in the early twentieth century. It is produced in Taean and Seosan in South Korea.

References

Bibliography

External links
Malta  Comprehensive profile for Allium nigrum photo
United States Department of Agriculture Plants Profile: Allium nigrum

nigrum
Onions
Taxa named by Carl Linnaeus
Plants described in 1762